Friedrich-Georg "Fritz" Thielen (25 September 1916 – 11 June 1993) was a German politician with the Christian Democratic Union (CDU), the German Party, the Gesamtdeutsche Partei and the National Democratic Party of Germany (NPD).

Thielen was born in Bremen and after working as a sawmill operator in Germany and in brickyards in occupied Ukraine, Thielen became a soldier in 1943 until the end of World War II. After the war he became a successful businessman in the building trade in Bremen.

He joined the CDU in 1946 and became a leading figure locally before decamping to join the German Party in 1958, becoming one of its leading figures. In this capacity he merged his party into the newly formed NPD and became the first leader of the party. Replaced by Adolf von Thadden in 1967 he left the NPD and reactivated the German Party locally, with little success.

References

1916 births
1993 deaths
Christian Democratic Union of Germany politicians
German military personnel of World War II
Leaders of political parties in Germany
Politicians from Bremen
National Democratic Party of Germany politicians
German nationalists
Political party founders